This is a list of active and extinct volcanoes.

References

Samoa, Western

Volcanoes